The Sturmpistole ("assault-pistol") was an attempt by Germany during World War II to create a multi-purpose weapon which could be used by any infantryman. It consisted of a modified flare gun (Leuchtpistole) which could fire a variety of grenades, including a  shaped charge Panzerwurfkörper 42 which could penetrate  of rolled homogeneous armor.  The idea was not pursued wholeheartedly, and took second stage to the then current anti-tank rifles and later weapon developments, such as the Panzerfaust recoilless and Panzerschreck rocket.

Service use 
The Sturmpistole was a multi-purpose weapon for signaling, illumination, target marking, or concealment with a smoke grenade.  Later during World War II, explosive rounds were developed to give German troops a small and lightweight grenade launcher for engaging targets from close range which could not be engaged satisfactorily by infantry weapons or artillery without endangering friendly troops.  Conversions of both the Leuchtpistole 34 and Leuchtpistole 42 flare guns are reported to exist.  The conversion included adding a buttstock and sights for the different grenades.

Sturmpistoles delivered to Romania were in use of Pioniere battalions.

Available projectiles included:

 Multi-Star Signal Cartridge - This was a multi-star signal flare that contained three red and three green stars that could be set for six different color combinations.
Panzerwurfkörper 42 - This was a HEAT grenade that could be used against enemy armor. It was similar in layout to the Wurfkorper 361 and used a rifled cartridge case.
Wurfgranate Patrone 326 - This was a small, breech loaded, fin stabilized, explosive grenade, with a nose fuze that was designed for short range low angle direct fire use.  It was not recommended for use beyond  due to inaccuracy or less than  due to the risk from shell fragments.
Wurfkorper 361 - The Wurfkorper 361 was formed by screwing a Bakelite or wooden stem into an Eierhandgranate 39 which allowed it to be fired from a Leuchtpistole. A brass or aluminum shell casing with propellant was first loaded into the breech of the gun. The stem was then slid down the muzzle until it slipped into the shell casing, the breech was then closed and the gun could be fired. The Wurfkorper 361 was used for high angle indirect fire where its shrapnel would be useful.

Gallery

Notes

References
Robert A. Slayton, Arms of Destruction: Ranking the World's Best Land Weapons of WWII, Citadel Press, New York: Kensington Publishing Corp., 

2.7 cm Leuchtpistole 38, and Kampfpistole Sturmpistole
Sturmpistole in use of Romanian Pioniere units

World War II infantry weapons of Germany
Anti-tank weapons
Trial and research firearms of Germany
Military equipment introduced from 1940 to 1944